Mousefood, Melqurat, Maqaruaruat or Anlleq is a native foraged food and medicine highly prized by Yupik people on the Yukon-Kuskokwim Delta.

Foraging 
Mousefood consists of the roots of various tundra plants which are cached by "mice" (voles) in burrows. People forage and eat the food that the "mice" have harvested and stored. Elders teach that when collecting mousefood, one should always leave half of the cache for the "mouse". They also recommend leaving a gift – something that the "mouse" can eat.

Species 
Various species of tundra plants may be foraged as mousefood. The roots of tall cottongrass, white cottongrass and Russett cottongrass are less than an inch long. They are eaten, put in soup, or used medicinally with seal oil. "Eskimo sweet potatoes" are the roots of Hedysarum alpinum.  As the name suggests, these roots are somewhat sweet and are used in Akutaq.

References 

Inuit cuisine